St Wilfrid's Church, Harrogate is an Anglican parish church in the town of Harrogate, North Yorkshire, England. It is a Grade I listed building, the only such building in Harrogate. It was designed by the architect Temple Lushington Moore and is his most famous work. It is designated as a "Major Parish Church" and is the 38th largest parish church in England.

History

The construction of the church started in 1904 following a bequest of £3,485 from the estate of the late Bishop of Ripon to the Ecclesiastical Commissioners.  This allocation was instrumental in procuring an Order in Council on 12 August 1904 for the formation of the new district of St Wilfrid, Harrogate. The church was estimated to cost around £24,000.

The Bishop of Knaresborough dedicated the Nave and Baptistry on 4 January 1908 which had consumed £11,000.

Two sisters, Elizabeth Sophia and Jean Trotter gave large donations to fund the completion. The first gift of £10,000, allowed the nave to be completed by 1914. The church was consecrated on Thursday 11 June 1914 by the Bishop of Ripon at which point the initial estimated cost of £24,000 had already been spent. The church had to be guarded all night by a band of church workers to prevent it being the object of attention on the part of militant Suffragettes.

Temple Moore died in 1920 and a bequest from Jean Trotter in 1924 of £32,000, allowed the completion of the north and south transepts. The work was completed in 1927 by Temple Moore's son-in-law, Leslie Moore. In 1928, the organ was installed in the north transepts. The organ and transepts were dedicated by the Bishop of Oxford on 18 July 1928.

William Gunn left £9,000, in his will of 1932 and this allowed the church hall to be built. The hall features a lamella roof, the only example of such a construction in the United Kingdom.

In 1935, the generosity of Sir William Nicholson allowed the Lady Chapel to be built by William Nicholson and Son of Leeds at a cost of £10,000. The Calvary was the work of Alfred Southwick.  While most of the work after Temple Moore's death in 1920 had been sympathetic to his sketches, Leslie Moore's design for the Lady Chapel was radically different from the small chapel proposed by this father-in-law.

Reception
The church is widely considered to be Temple Moore's greatest work. It subtly dominates the Harrogate skyline, and Pevsner considers it to be "the biggest and by far the best of Harrogate's churches, the masterwork of Temple Moore". Sir Aston Webb highlights its national importance, and goes as far as to say it is "perhaps the most beautiful of all parish churches I know" (Yorkshire Post, 8 June 1935). The church is subject of Sir John Betjeman's poem "Perp. Revival i' the North", in which its elegant grandeur and traditional liturgy are identified. Elsewhere, he remarks how the building seems vast in every direction, enhanced by what he describes as "Edwardian vistas".

Leslie Moore's faithful completion of his father-in-law's masterpiece is a great credit to him. His skill as an architect is further credited by the Church Times for February 24, 1950, which writes "Mr Leslie Moore has outdone his uncle by adding the loveliest part of the building - the Lady Chapel". In a local newspaper, reviewing the dedication of the Lady Chapel, it was described as a "glorious pageant in Christian architecture".

On 4 February 1975, St Wilfrid's Church was designated a Grade I listed building.

Music

Musicians
Since the dedication of the building, there has been an uninterrupted choral tradition in the parish. A Music Foundation was established in 2015 to enhance the musical life of the parish, and improve the musical facilities available.

Former Directors of Music and organists include David Halls, now of Salisbury Cathedral, James McDonald, now of St Giles Pontefract, Leonard Sandermann and Simon Lindley. The current Director of Music is Anthony Gray, formerly of Southwell Minster and Robinson College, Cambridge.

Organ

The Harrison and Harrison organ in the north transept was installed in 1928 upon completion of this part of the church. Its outline form is based on a 1912 sketch by Temple Moore, with minor alterations by Leslie Moore and Harry Harrison. Due to a lack of funds, no case proper was realised. The instrument was voiced by Arthur Harrison, and is one of the best preserved examples of his work. As such, the organ received Grade II*-listing from the British Institute of Organ Studies.

Due to lack of funds, eight stops, three chests, and one reservoir were not installed in 1928. Generations since have displayed a continuous commitment to the completion of the organ, with additions (mostly sympathetic) in 1942, 1968, 1972, 1982, and 2011. A restoration project is currently in the consultation phase.

Bells
St Wilfrid's Church has eight bells, for change-ringing, in the central tower. The heaviest six bells, cast from redundant bells from High Hoyland, were installed in 1973. The [tenor] of the peal weighs 6 cwt and 3 lbs and is tuned to C. In 1976 two redundant bells were obtained and the ring was increased to eight in 1977.

Additionally there is a Sanctus bell in the South-East tower.

Incumbents

1902 William Fowell Swann (became Vicar in 1914)
1919 Donald Mackenzie Maynard Bartlett
1940 Kenneth Ilderton
1951 Thomas Henry Henderson
1963 Walter Dillam
1973 Michael Richard John Manktelow later Bishop of Basingstoke
1978 Howard Garside
1990 Brian Robert Pearson
2001 Mark Sowerby, later Bishop of Horsham
2010 Gary Waddington

Events
The funeral of David Simpson, freeman of the town, and four times mayor of Harrogate, was held here on 17 January 1931.

See also
List of new churches by Temple Moore

References

Bibliography
The Story of St Wilfrid's church, Harrogate. Third Edition. c. 1950s
The Parish Church of St Wilfrid, Harrogate. c. 1990s

External links

Specification of the organ

Anglican Diocese of Leeds
Church of England church buildings in North Yorkshire
Grade I listed churches in North Yorkshire
St. Wilfred's
Temple Moore buildings
Anglo-Catholic church buildings in North Yorkshire